Pablo Villalobos (born 20 May 1979) is a Spanish long-distance runner.  He finished seventh in the 5,000m final at the 2006 European Athletics Championships in Gothenburg and fifth in the marathon at the 2010 European Athletics Championships in Barcelona. In 2013 created of campoatraves.com, a Spanish website about the athletics long distance of cross country.

References

External links
Personal website
campoatraves.com website

1978 births
Spanish male long-distance runners
Living people
Spanish male marathon runners